Leonardo Taurino (born 25 July 1995) is an Italian football player.

Club career
He made his Serie B debut for Ternana on 4 November 2014 in a game against Virtus Entella.

References

External links
 

1995 births
Sportspeople from Taranto
Footballers from Apulia
Living people
Italian footballers
Ternana Calcio players
A.S. Martina Franca 1947 players
Casertana F.C. players
S.S. Fidelis Andria 1928 players
Serie B players
Serie C players
Association football forwards